The Ashley School, in Lowestoft, Suffolk, England is a special school for pupils with Moderate Learning Difficulties and complex needs. The school has been twice graded "outstanding" by OFSTED.  It is considered a specialist school for Cognition and Learning.

Background
The Ashley School provides education for around 135 students with moderate/complex learning difficulties aged 7–16. The school offers housing options for 29 students from Monday through Thursday.

The school provides numerous therapeutic services for their pupils including a speech and language team.

References

External links
 

Special schools in Suffolk
Academies in Suffolk
Special secondary schools in England
Specialist SEN colleges in England